Elias dos Santos Bueno (born September 17, 1993), known as Elias, is a Brazilian professional footballer who plays as a winger for Inter SM.

Career
Elias was born in Porto Alegre, and has starred in several clubs of the gaúcho football, as São Luiz, Panambi and Palmeirense. Before coming to Brasil de Pelotas, Elias was in Aimoré. Started his career playing with São Luiz. He made his professional debut during the 2013 season.

References

External links

Elias at ZeroZero

1993 births
Living people
Sportspeople from Rio Grande do Sul
Brazilian footballers
Association football midfielders
Esporte Clube São Luiz players
Clube Esportivo Aimoré players
Grêmio Esportivo Brasil players
Figueirense FC players
Joinville Esporte Clube players
Clube de Regatas Brasil players
Esporte Clube Avenida players
América Futebol Clube (RN) players
Esporte Clube Novo Hamburgo players
Sociedade Esportiva do Gama players
Sociedade Desportiva Juazeirense players
Ferroviário Atlético Clube (CE) players
Esporte Clube Internacional players
Campeonato Brasileiro Série B players
Campeonato Brasileiro Série D players